Alain Gagnol (born 1967) is a French film maker. In January 2012, he was nominated for an Academy Award for the animated movie A Cat in Paris. He also directed Phantom Boy.

References

External links

French animators
French animated film directors
French film directors
Living people
1967 births
People from Roanne